Jewish Board of Guardians may refer to: 
 Jewish Board of Guardians (New York), a precursor to the Jewish Board of Family and Children's Services
 Jewish Board of Guardians (United Kingdom), founded in London in 1859.